Patrick Kombayi (2 November 1938 – 20 June 2009) was a Zimbabwean businessman, a former mayor of Gweru and an active member of the Movement for Democratic Change-Tsvangirai faction in the Midlands Province. He served in the Senate of Zimbabwe for the Chirumhanzu-Gweru senatorial constituency.
Kombayi, a student of Robert Mugabe, was the first black train driver in Zimbabwe. He joined Rhodesia Railways after pursuing an unsatisfying career as a schoolteacher. Posted to Zambia, Kombayi became involved with the Zimbabwe African National Union.

Assassination attempt
In 1990, he campaigned against Simon Muzenda but was shot during his campaign. He was left permanently disabled. This wound was to kill him 19 years later. The men responsible for the shooting were convicted of the crime but never spent a day in prison, as they were pardoned by Mugabe.

House of Assembly Elections 2008
In early 2008, he was arrested for defacing a road with two of his election agents.

References 

Gweru
1938 births
2009 deaths
Members of the Senate of Zimbabwe
Mayors of places in Zimbabwe
Movement for Democratic Change – Tsvangirai politicians